Baseball Tasmania is the governing body of baseball within Tasmania.

After a number of years without an organised baseball body in the state, a league was re-formed in 2007 with the hopes of re-igniting baseball in the state.

History 

Baseball reached its peak in Tasmania during the 1970s and 1980s, with a league in both Hobart and Launceston.  However, by the late 1980s, the Launceston league was forced to disband as league started to lack players to fill the teams.  The Hobart league lasted until the early 1990s before it folded due to financial troubles.

There was no organised baseball in Tasmania after the collapse of the Hobart league, until 2007, a group of Masters players got together with the goal of re-instating a league in the state's capital of Hobart.  This was primarily driven by a group of Masters players who had been involved in the previous incarnation of Baseball Tasmania many years ago and wished to restart a baseball league in Tasmania.

After some initial open days, the new league was launched in October 2007 with 4 teams: Red Sox, Whitesox, Blue Jays and Green Bays.  The Blue Jays won the first ever game of new league.

Two seasons were run in the original summer, with a season being run until the Christmas break in December and then a new season running from January until March.

Games were played at Prince of Wales Bay Recreation Ground in Goodwood (in the city of Glenorchy, north of Hobart) till the 2012-13 season when the ground underwent a major overhaul to install new storm water pipes. The 2012-13 season was played at Goodwood Primary School and with ongoing problems at Prince of Wales Bay, the 2013-14 season was initially played there also until half way through the season when circumstances warranted a move to Shoobridge Park in Claremont.

Changes began occurring in the 2013-14 season with the introduction of the Dragons Softball team (the last remaining men's softball team in southern Tasmania), the allocation of recruiting zones to each of the teams and the renaming of the league to the Hobart Summer Baseball League (HSBL), with Baseball Tasmania the governing body. The Athletics became the Eastern Athletics, the Red Sox became the Southern Red Sox, the White Sox became the Northern White Sox and the Blue Jays retained their name but had a recruiting area of central Hobart. Once again the league tried a five team competition but by the last month of the season, numbers for the White Sox and the Red Sox had dropped off so dramatically that the remaining players had to amalgamate to form a viable team.

The 2014-15 season heralded the return of the league to Prince of Wales Bay Recreation Ground and with it, a new found enthusiasm. Full-time scorers were introduced for the first time and by mid season, all teams had secured proper uniforms to look the part for playing baseball. The competition, back to a four team format with the Dragons, Eastern Athletics, Hobart Blue Jays, and the Northern White Sox, was highly competitive and for the first time, a sponsor was involved in the league with Hotel Soho agreeing to sponsor the Hobart Blue Jays. 

For a number of years, an over 45 team, representing the Baseball Tasmania league under the name of the Tassie Tigers, had traveled to Ballarat (or Geelong) in Victoria to compete in the Victorian Masters Baseball Carnival. With the drive and enthusiasm of players renewed in 2014-15, Tasmania sent two teams to compete in the Victorian Masters Baseball Carnival for the first time, the usual over 45's and the new over 35's. The over 35's were super competitive but failed to win a match whilst the over 45's played inspired team baseball to eventually win their first title, defeating the Big Cat Tomatoes in the Grand Final, 12-1.

Off the field, the future of baseball was questioned as there was an absence of young players coming through the ranks. Southern Softball was experiencing a similar problem so Baseball Tasmania and the Southern Softball Association formed a joint venture to re-introduce t-ball to school children and through that, give them the skills and options to play baseball or softball. The Batter Up T-ball League was formed and the first games were played on Saturday 24 October 2015.

Season 2007-2008 Part 1 (Pre-Christmas) 

Teams
 Red Sox
 Whitesox
 Blue Jays
 Green Bays

The first season of the new league was a successful twilight league, with Sunday games occurring for the season opener and the finals series.  After a relatively easy season, the Blue Jays were inaugurated as the league's first champion after defeating the Whitesox in the Grand Final.

Season 2007-2008 Part 2 (Post-Christmas) 

Teams
 Red Sox
 Whitesox
 Blue Jays
 Green Bays
 Gold Diggers
 Orange Ruffies

After some post-Christmas talent re-distribution and the creation of a fifth (the Gold Diggers) and sixth (the Orange Ruffies) team, the second season was a much closer affair and though the Blue Jays once again met the Whitesox in the Grand Final, the 'Sox would exact revenge for the first season loss.  The Orange Ruffies would fold after just 2 games due to over-stretched playing personnel across all the teams and would be replaced with a Tasmanian Masters side that would play the Ruffies' scheduled opponent in an exhibition game for the remainder of the season.

Season 2008-2009 

Teams
 Red Sox
 Whitesox
 Blue Jays
 Athletics (previously Green Bays)
 Royals (previously Gold Diggers)

The 2008-2009 season started with five teams but after only two weeks, the Royals team was folded due to lack of numbers and the remaining players were moved into the four original teams.  Over 18 recorded rounds of competition, the league became divided with the Whitesox and Blue Jays once again fighting for the top spot while the Red Sox and Athletics showed positive signs but quickly lost touch with the other two teams.  The Whitesox would go on to win the Grand Final, once again facing the Blue Jays.

Season 2009-2010 

Teams
 Athletics
 Blue Jays
 Red Sox
 Whitesox

A strong start to the season by the Blue Jays established the foundation for them to finish the season as minor premiers.  For the first time, all four teams were involved in a traditional four-team finals system.  The Red Sox were unfortunately decimated with injury and player departure and fell off as the season progressed, but the Athletics had unlocked some new talent and the Whitesox had returning players when the season entered the finals series.

1st Semi Final: Athletics def Red Sox
2nd Semi Final: Whitesox def Blue Jays
Preliminary Final: Blue Jays def Athletics
Grand Final: Whitesox def Blue Jays

Season 2010-2011 

Teams
 Athletics
 Blue Jays
 Red Sox
 Whitesox

The 2010/2011 season saw the first indication that early days of the Whitesox and Blue Jays dominating the competition were coming to an end with the Blue Jays falling from defending 4-time Minor Premier to wooden spooner.  This did not stop the Whitesox from having another strong season, allowing them to capture their first Minor Premiership.  But it would turn out that being minor premier was starting to show that it carried a curse with it.  Despite being runaway contenders during the minor season, the Red Sox broke through for not only their first ever finals win, but also their maiden premiership, upsetting the defending champions in the Grand Final.

1st Semi Final: Athletics def Blue Jays
2nd Semi Final : Red Sox def Whitesox
Preliminary Final: Whitesox def Athletics
Grand Final: Red Sox def Whitesox

Season 2011-2012 

Teams
 Athletics
 Blue Jays
 Red Sox
 Whitesox

Despite starting the season with a 1-3-1 record, the Blue Jays won the final 12 games of the season (one round lost due to bad weather) to record the best ever regular season record for a team.  This didn't bode well though as the team's fifth minor premiership may have heralded a fifth Grand Final appearance but the curse of the minor premier continued.  An injury-plagued and departure riddle Whitesox fell to their first wooden spoon and the Athletics captured their maiden premiership when they easily accounted for the Blue Jays in the Grand Final.

1st Semi Final: Athletics def Red Sox
2nd Semi Final: Blue Jays def Whitesox
Grand Final: Athletics def Blue Jays

Season 2012-13 
Teams
 Athletics
 Blue Jays
 Red Sox
 White Sox

Champions 

 Season I (2007): Blue Jays defeated Whitesox
 Season II (2008): Whitesox defeated Blue Jays
 Season III (2008–2009): Whitesox defeated Blue Jays
 Season IV (2009–2010): Whitesox defeated Blue Jays
 Season V (2010-2011): Red Sox defeated Whitesox
 Season VI (2011-2012): Athletics defeated Blue Jays
 Season VII (2012-2013): Athletics defeated Blue Jays
 Season VIII (2013-2014): Eastern Athletics defeated Dragons
 Season IX (2014-2015): Northern White Sox defeated Dragons

Team Records 

 Most Premierships: Whitesox (3)
 Most Grand Finals: Blue Jays (6)
 Most Wooden Spoons: Athletics (Green Bays) (3)
 Most Minor Premierships: Blue Jays (6)
 Best Season Record: Blue Jays (2011/2012 - 13 wins, 3 losses, 1 draw)
 Most Finals Wins: Whitesox (5)

External links 
Baseball Tasmania website

Sports governing bodies in Tasmania
Tas